Ed Glover was a state legislator in Arkansas. He represented Jefferson County, Arkansas in the Arkansas House of Representatives in 1885. He was a Republican, representing Jefferson County, Arkansas.

He was a Kentucky native, originally a farmer, a Baptist and had been resident in Arkansas for 9 years when elected in 1955 aged 36.

His fellow representatives from Jefferson County in 1885 were W. B. Jacko and S. H. Scott, elected September 1, 1884.

References

Republican Party members of the Arkansas House of Representatives
Baptists from Arkansas
Baptists from Kentucky
People from Jefferson County, Arkansas
19th-century American politicians